Alonge is a Yoruba surname. Notable people with the surname include:

 Adebayo Alonge, Nigerian pharmacist
 Solomon Osagie Alonge, pioneer of Nigerian photography.